Phantom Beirut (Arabic: أشباح بيروت ashbah bayroot) is a 1998 Lebanese film by the Lebanese director Ghassan Salhab.

Plot
At the end of the 1980s, it seems the Lebanese conflict will never end. Khalil, a man in his thirties, returns to Beirut after many years. More than ten years earlier, during a battle, he took advantage of the confusion and pretended he was dead. He then disappeared and adopted a false identity. But Beirut is a small town, and people are increasingly beginning to recognize him.

Cast
 Aouni Kawas 
 Darina El Joundi 
 Rabih Mroué
 Carol Abboud
 Hassan Farhat
 Younes Aoude
 Ahmad Ali Zein
 Nada Ali Zein

External links
 Trailer of the movie
 

1998 films
1998 drama films
Lebanese drama films
1990s Arabic-language films
Films directed by Ghassan Salhab